Night in the city or variation, may refer to:

 Night in the City, 1933 Chinese silent film
 "Night in the City", a Joni Mitchell song from the 1968 album Song to a Seagull
 "Night in the City", an Electric Light Orchestra song from the 1977 album Out of the Blue
 "A Night in the City", a song from the 1982 album Dvadeset Godina by the band Piloti (band)
 "Night in the City", a 2000 single by P.M. Dawn

See also

 One Night in One City, a 2007 Czech horror film
 "Last Night in the City", a song by Duran Duran from the 2015 album Paper Gods
 "One Night in the City", a song by Dio off the 1984 album The Last in Line
 
 Night and the City (disambiguation)
 City of night (disambiguation)
 Night city (disambiguation)
 Night (disambiguation)
 City (disambiguation)